Evelyn Frances Leland (c. 1870 - c. 1930) was an American astronomer and "Harvard computer", one of the women who worked at the Harvard College Observatory with Edward Pickering. She worked there from 1889 to 1925 as part of a team of low-paid assistants, initially earning 25 cents an hour.

The observatory's research on stellar spectra required meticulous analysis of numerous fragile glass plates on which light from distant bodies had been captured at the Arequipa Station in Peru, and then shipped to Harvard's campus in Cambridge, Massachusetts. With other human "computers," Leland measured and calculated the brightness of the stellar spectra extensively, and discovered new variable stars as well as other "objects with peculiar spectra." She also worked on publishing papers with others from the observatory.

References 

American women astronomers
1870s births
1930s deaths
Harvard Computers
19th-century American astronomers
20th-century American astronomers
20th-century American women scientists
19th-century American women scientists